The 2013 Stetson Hatters football team represented Stetson University during the 2013 NCAA Division I FCS football season. They were led by first-year head coach Roger Hughes and played their home games at Spec Martin Stadium. They were a member of the Pioneer Football League. This was the first season the school had sponsored football since 1956. They finished the season 2–9, 1–7 in PFL play to finish in a tie for ninth place.

Schedule

Source: Schedule

Game summaries

Warner

at Florida Tech

Birmingham-Southern

San Diego

at Butler

Dayton

at Marist

Campbell

Davidson

at Jacksonville

at Mercer

References

Stetson
Stetson Hatters football seasons
Stetson Hatters football